Coates medieval settlement is a deserted medieval village in Lincolnshire, England. It is a Scheduled Monument.

History
The village of Coates was recorded in the Domesday Book of 1086, having then six households. In the late 12th century, the church and land of the village were given to Welbeck Abbey in Nottinghamshire. The population of the village had increased by the early 14th century, but later in the century was reduced by the  Black Death, and did not recover.

Earthworks
Today at Coates-by-Stow there are two farms, a hall, several cottages and the Grade I listed Church of St Edith. Medieval ridge and furrow cultivation is discernable in the field immediately west of Grange Farm. In the adjoining field to the west are the earthworks of the village. North of the northern range of buildings are indications of large rectangular enclosures, thought to have been medieval paddocks; inside these can be seen the ridge and furrow pattern of earlier cultivation in that area.

It is thought that there was a group of buildings within the moat, extending over an area where Coates Hall and Hall Farm now stand. The site may have been a grange of Welbeck Abbey, established in the late 12th century, of which only the church, whose oldest parts date from that time, survives.

See also
 List of lost settlements in the United Kingdom

References

Deserted medieval villages in Lincolnshire
Scheduled monuments in Lincolnshire